The Peres Academic Center ( Ha-Merkaz ha-Akademi Peres) is a private, not-for-profit, nonsectarian college in Rehovot, Israel. It was founded in 2006 by Ofra Elul. The president of the Center is Prof. Amos Drory and the rector is Prof. Ron Shapira. In 2008 it was recognized by the Council for Higher Education in Israel.

in 2013 former US president Bill Clinton gave a speech in the Center.

References 

Colleges in Israel